The Abbey of Fulda (German Kloster Fulda, Latin Abbatia Fuldensis), from 1221 the Princely Abbey of Fulda (Fürstabtei Fulda) and from 1752 the Prince-Bishopric of Fulda (Fürstbistum Fulda), was a Benedictine abbey and ecclesiastical principality centered on Fulda, in the present-day German state of Hesse.

The monastery was founded in 744 by Saint Sturm, a disciple of Saint Boniface. After Boniface was buried at Fulda, it became a prominent center of learning and culture in Germany, and a site of religious significance and pilgrimage through the 8th and 9th centuries. The Annals of Fulda, one of the most important sources for the history of the Carolingian Empire in the 9th century, were written there. In 1221 the abbey was granted an imperial estate to rule and the abbots were thereafter princes of the Holy Roman Empire. In 1356, Emperor Charles IV bestowed the title "Archchancellor of the Empress" (Erzkanzler der Kaiserin) on the prince-abbot. The growth in population around Fulda would result in its elevation to a prince-bishopric in the second half of the 18th century.

Although the abbey was dissolved in 1802 and its principality was secularized in 1803, the diocese of Fulda continues to exist.

History

Carolingian period

In the mid-8th century, Saint Boniface commissioned Saint Sturm to establish a larger church than any other founded by Boniface. In January 744, Saint Sturm selected an unpopulated plot along the Fulda River, and shortly after obtained rights to the land. The foundation of the monastery dates to March 12, 744. Sturm travelled to notable monasteries of Italy, such as that of Monte Cassino, for inspiration in creating a monastery of such grand size and splendor. Boniface was proud of Fulda, and he would obtain autonomy for the monastery from the bishops of the area by appealing to Pope Zachary for placement directly under the Holy See in 751. Boniface would be entombed at Fulda following his martyrdom in 754 in Frisia, as per his request, creating a destination for pilgrimage in Germany and increasing its holy significance. Saint Sturm would be named the first abbot of the newly established monastery, and would lead Fulda through a period of rapid growth.

The monks of Fulda practiced many specialized trades, and much production took place in the monastery. Production of manuscripts increased the size of the library of Fulda, while skilled craftsmen produced many goods that would make monastery a financially wealthy establishment. As Fulda grew, members of the monastery would move from the main building and establish villages in the outlying territories to connect with non-monastery members. They would establish themselves based on trade and agriculture, while still remaining connected to the monastery. Together, the monks of Fulda would create a substantial library, financially stable production, and an effective centre for education. In 774, Carloman placed Fulda under his direct control to ensure its continued success. Fulda was becoming an important cultural center to the Carolingian Empire, and Carloman hoped to ensure the continued salvation of his population through the religious activity of Fulda.

The school at the Fulda monastery would become a major focus of the monks under Sturm's successor, Abbot Baugulf, at the turn of the century. It contained an inner school for Christian studies, and an outer school for secular, including pupils who were not necessarily members of the monastery. During Boniface's lifetime he had sent the teachers of Fulda to apprentice under notable scholars in Franconia, Bavaria, and Thuringia, who would return with knowledge and texts of the sciences, literature, and theology. In 787 Charlemagne praised Fulda as a model school for others, leading by example in educating the public in secular and ecclesiastical matters.

Around the year 807, an epidemic claimed much of Fulda's population.  During this time, the third abbot of Fulda, Ratgar, was carrying out construction on a new church started by Baugulf. According to the "Supplex Libellus", an account of Fulda's history written by the monks, Ratgar was overzealous, exiling monks opposed to the excessive attention being given to the new church, and punishing those attempting to flee the epidemic that was spreading amongst the population. This prompted a discussion in Fulda as to how the monastery was to be properly run, and the nature of the responsibilities of the monks.

Until this point, a focus of the monks had been remembering and recording the lives of the deceased, specifically those who were members of the Fulda monastery, in what was known as the “Annales Necrologici”.  They would sing psalms for their dead to ensure their eternal salvation. Under Ratgar, the focus of the monastery had shifted to that of construction and arbitrary regulation; monks were being exiled for questionable reasons, or punished in seemingly unjust ways. Another matter of concern included who was permitted into the inner monastery; Ratgar was at the time hosting a criminal in the living quarters. The concept of private and public property was also in contention. With the land of Fulda expanding, the monks desired all property to be public rather than create a contention for private land, while Ratgar opposed this perspective. The “Supplex Libellus” also attempted to address the issue of the growing secular responsibilities of the monastery. As the school grew and the communities around Fulda expanded, the monastery was feeling the strain of balancing ecclesiastical obligations with its newfound secular prominence. The monks were successful in their grievances against Ratgar, and Louis the Pious sympathized with them. Agreeing that Ratgar's plans were too ambitions for Fulda, and his punishments too extensive, he exiled Ratgar from Fulda in 817, and Eigil became the fourth Abbot of Fulda.

Under Abbot Eigil's leadership, construction of the new church continued at a more moderate pace. He sought to stylize the church after St. Peter's in Rome, adding a notable western transept in the same fashion. The transept was a new architectural style, and in mimicking it, Fulda demonstrated their support to the papacy through tribute. This unique architectural tie, as well as the growing intellectual importance of Fulda, would create strong ties with the Roman papacy. Coupled with the tomb of Saint Boniface, Fulda would attract much religious pilgrimage and worship, a site of great significance.

In 822, Rabanus Maurus became the fifth abbot of Fulda. He was previously educated at the monastery, and was very academically inclined, becoming both a teacher and head-master at the school before becoming abbot. Understanding the importance of education, the school became the main focus of Fulda under his leadership, and he would lead Fulda to the height of its importance and success.  He established separate departments for the school, including those for sciences, theological studies, and the arts. Rabanus made an effort to collect various additional holy relics and manuscripts of historical significance to Fulda and the surrounding the areas to fortify their prominence in the Frankish Empire. With each relic, the significance of Fulda grew, and more gifts and power were bestowed upon the abbey. Power was, however, not Rabanus's only intent; the increased holiness of the lands would also serve to bring his monks and pilgrims closer to God.  The collection accumulated under Rabanus would largely be lost during the looting of Fulda by the Hessians during the Thirty Years' War.

Imperial principality
Succeeding abbots would carry the monastery down the same path, with Fulda retaining a place of prominence in the German territories. With the decline of the Carolingian rule, Fulda lost its security and would rely increasingly on patronage from independent sources. The abbot of Fulda would hold the position of primate over all Benedictine monasteries in Germany for several centuries. From 1221 and onwards, the abbots would also serve as Princes of the Holy Roman Empire, given this rank by Emperor Frederick II of Hohenstaufen, and resulted in increased secular as well as monastic obligations. The increased importance of Fulda resulted in much patronage and wealth; as a result, the wealthy and noble would eventually make up the majority of the abbey's population. The wealthy monks used their positions for their own means, going as far as to attempt to turn monastic lands into their own private property. This caused great unrest by the 14th century, and Count Johann con Ziegenhain would lead an insurrection, alongside other citizens of Fulda, against Prince-Abbot Heinrich VI, 55th abbot of the monastery. The combination of responsibilities to the empire and corruption of traditional monastic ideals, so highly valued by Boniface and the early abbots, placed great strain on the monastery and its school.

In the later Middle Ages, a dean of the monastic school would functionally replace the abbot concerning scholastic management, once more granting it relative independence concerning ecclesiastical functions of Fulda. However, the monastery and surrounding city would never regain its status as a great cultural center it once held during the early medieval years. The monastery was dissolved in 1802. The spiritual principality was secularized in 1803 after the Reichsdeputationshauptschluss, but the episcopal see continued.

The secular territory of Fulda was joined the Principality of Orange-Nassau along with several other mediatized lands to form the Principality of Nassau-Orange-Fulda. Prince William Frederick refused to join the Confederation of the Rhine and, following the dissolution of the Holy Roman Empire in August 1806, fled to Berlin. Fulda was taken over by the French. In 1810 it was given to the Grand Duchy of Frankfurt, but was occupied by Austria from 1813 and by Prussia from 1815. the Congress of Vienna resurrected it as the Grand Duchy of Fulda and gave it to the Electorate of Hesse in 1815.

Library and scriptorium
The library held approximately 2000 manuscripts. It preserved works such as Tacitus' Annales, Ammianus Marcellinus' Res gestae, and the Codex Fuldensis which has the reputation of serving as the cradle of Old High German literature. It was probably here that an Italian book-hunter in 1417 discovered the last surviving manuscript of Lucretius's De Rerum Natura, which then became enormously influential in humanist circles. Its abundant records are conserved in the state archives at Marburg.  the Fulda manuscripts have become widely dispersed; some have found their way to the Vatican Library.

A notable work that the monks of Fulda produced was the "Annales necrologici", a list of all the deceased members of the abbey following the death of Saint Sturm in 744. The monks would offer prayer for the dead listed in the Annales to ensure their eternal salvation. While at first this record only contained the names of those at Fulda, as the power and prominence of Fulda grew, so too did the scope of who was to be included in the Annales. Patrons, citizens, and nobles of the area would all come to be recorded in this piece of Fulda and its concept of community. The documenting of dates of passing, beginning with Sturm, created a sense of continuity and a reference for the passage of time for the monks of Fulda.

List of rulers

Abbots
 Saint Sturm 744-779
 Baugulf 779-802
 Ratgar 802-817
 Eigil 818-822
 Rabanus Maurus 822-842
 Hatto I. 842-856
 Thioto 856-869
 Sigihart 869-891
 Huoggi 891-915
 Helmfried 915-916
 Haicho 917-923
 Hiltibert 923-927
 Hadamar 927-956
 Hatto II. 956-968
 Werinheri 968-982
 Branthoh I. 982-991
 Hatto III. 991-997
 Erkanbald 997–1011
 Branthoh II. 1011–1013
 Poppo 1013–1018, also Abbot of Lorsch (Franconian Babenberger)
 Richard 1018–1039
 Sigiwart 1039–1043
 Rohing 1043–1047
 Egbert 1047–1058
 Siegfried von Eppenstein 1058–1060, also Archbishop of Mainz
 Widerad von Eppenstein 1060–1075
 Ruothart 1075–1096
 Godefrid 1096–1109
 Wolfhelm 1109–1114
 Erlolf von Bergholz 1114–1122
 Ulrich von Kemnaten 1122–1126
 Heinrich I. von Kemnaten 1126–1132
 Bertho I. von Schlitz 1132–1134
 Konrad I. 1134–1140
 Aleholf 1140–1148
 Rugger I. 1148
 Heinrich II. von Bingarten 1148–1149
 Markward I. 1150–1165
 Gernot von Fulda 1165
 Hermann 1165–1168
 Burchard Graf von Nürings 1168–1176
 Rugger II. 1176–1177
 Konrad II. 1177–1192
 Heinrich III. von Kronberg im Taunus 1192–1216
 Hartmann I. 1216–1217
 Kuno 1217–1221

Prince-Abbots
 Konrad III. von Malkes 1221–1249
 Heinrich IV. von Erthal 1249–1261
 Bertho II. von Leibolz 1261–1271
 Bertho III. von Mackenzell 1271–1272
 Bertho IV. von Biembach 1273–1286
 Markward II. von Bickenbach 1286–1288
 Heinrich V. Graf von Weilnau 1288–1313
 Eberhard von Rotenstein 1313–1315
 Heinrich VI. von Hohenberg 1315–1353
 Heinrich VII. von Kranlucken 1353–1372
 Konrad IV. Graf von Hanau 1372–1383
 Friedrich I. von Romrod 1383–1395
 Johann I. von Merlau 1395–1440
 Hermann II. von Buchenau 1440–1449
 Reinhard Graf von Weilnau 1449–1472
 Johann II. Graf von Henneberg-Schleusingen 1472–1513
 Hartmann II. Burggraf von Kirchberg 1513–1521/29
 Johann III. Graf von Henneberg-Schleusingen 1521/29–1541
 Philipp Schenk zu Schweinsberg 1541–1550
 Wolfgang Dietrich von Eusigheim 1550–1558
 Wolfgang Schutzbar (named Milchling) 1558–1567
 Philipp Georg Schenk zu Schweinsberg 1567–1568
 Wilhelm Hartmann von Klauer zu Wohra 1568–1570
 Balthasar von Dernbach, 1570–1606 (exiled 1576–1602)
 Julius Echter von Mespelbrunn, Bishop of Würzburg, administrator 1576–1602
 Johann Friedrich von Schwalbach 1606–1622
 Johann Bernhard Schenk zu Schweinsberg 1623–1632
 Johann Adolf von Hoheneck 1633–1635
 Hermann Georg von Neuhof (named Ley) 1635–1644
 Joachim Graf von Gravenegg 1644–1671
 Cardinal Gustav Adolf (Baden) (Bernhard Gustav Markgraf von Baden-Durlach) 1671–1677
 Placidus von Droste 1678–1700
 Adalbert I. von Schleifras 1700–1714
 Konstantin von Buttlar 1714–1726
 Adolphus von Dalberg 1726–1737
 Amand von Buseck, 1737–1756, Prince-Bishop after 1752

Prince-Bishops/Prince-Abbots

 Adalbert II. von Walderdorff 1757–1759
 Heinrich VIII. von Bibra, 1759–1788
 , 1789–1802, remained bishop until 1814

References

Further reading 
 Germania Benedictina, Bd.VII: Die benediktinischen Mönchs- und Nonnenklöster in Hessen, 1. Auflage 2004 St. Ottilien, S. 214–375

External links 
 History of the Bishopric of Fulda
 Geschichtsquellen im Netz

Benedictine monasteries in Germany
Monasteries in Hesse
Carolingian architecture
Fulda
1500s establishments in the Holy Roman Empire
1500 establishments in Europe
Imperial abbeys disestablished in 1802–03
Religious buildings and structures completed in 774
Prince-bishoprics of the Holy Roman Empire in Germany
Former monarchies of Europe
Former theocracies